In functional analysis, a branch of mathematics, a selection theorem is a theorem that guarantees the existence of a single-valued selection function from a given set-valued map. There are various selection theorems, and they are important in the theories of differential inclusions, optimal control, and mathematical economics.

Preliminaries 
Given two sets X and Y, let F be a set-valued function from X and Y. Equivalently,  is a function from X to the power set of Y.

A function  is said to be a selection of F if

 

In other words, given an input x for which the original function F returns multiple values, the new function f returns a single value. This is a special case of a choice function.

The axiom of choice implies that a selection function always exists; however, it is often important that the selection have some "nice" properties, such as continuity or measurability. This is where the selection theorems come into action: they guarantee that, if F satisfies certain properties, then it has a selection f that is continuous or has other desirable properties.

Selection theorems for set-valued functions 
The approximate selection theorem says that the following conditions are sufficient for the existence of a continuous selection:

 : compact metric space

 : nonempty compact, convex subset of a normed linear space  

  a set-valued function, all values nonempty, compact, convex. 

  has closed graph.  

The Michael selection theorem says that the following conditions are sufficient for the existence of a continuous selection:

 X is a paracompact space;
 Y is a Banach space;
 F is lower hemicontinuous;
 for all x in X, the set F(x) is nonempty, convex and closed.

The Deutsch–Kenderov theorem generalizes Michael's theorem as follows:

 X is a paracompact space;
 Y is a normed vector space;
 F is almost lower hemicontinuous, that is, at each  for each neighborhood  of  there exists a neighborhood  of  such that 
 for all x in X, the set F(x) is nonempty and convex.

In a later note, Xu proved that the Deutsch–Kenderov theorem is also valid if  is a locally convex topological vector space.

The Yannelis-Prabhakar selection theorem says that the following conditions are sufficient for the existence of a continuous selection:

 X is a paracompact Hausdorff space;
 Y is a linear topological space;
 for all x in X, the set F(x) is nonempty and convex;
 for all y in Y, the inverse set F−1(y) is an open set in X.

Other selection theorems for set-valued functions include:
 Bressan–Colombo directionally continuous selection theorem
 Castaing representation theorem
 Fryszkowski decomposable map selection
 Helly's selection theorem
 Zero-dimensional Michael selection theorem
 Robert Aumann measurable selection theorem

Selection theorems for set-valued sequences 
 Blaschke selection theorem

References 

Theorems in functional analysis